Nygårdsparken is a public park located in the city centre of Bergen in Vestland county, Norway. It is located between the neighbourhoods of Nygård and Møhlenpris. Covering , Nygårdsparken is the largest urban park in Bergen.

History
Nygårdsparken was conceived by the physicians Joachim Georg Wiesener and Klaus Hanssen, who founded the Park Association of Nygaard (Nygaards Parkselskab) in 1880. Modeled on the typical English park, it was laid out by the Danish gardener S. Lund Leiberg.

In 1898, the "Bergen exhibition" changed the park into an exhibition area. With a ticket costing 50 øre you could visit a small zoo and a botanical garden, study objects from Nansen's polar expeditions, and take the elevator to the top of Wisbech & Meinich's "Panorama tower with electric elevator". A lift attendant in uniform was in charge of what was most likely the first elevator in Bergen. Norway's first elevator was namely produced in the same year, in Wisbech's factory in Christiania.

Today

Following the uncontrolled expansion of the city in the last half of the 20th century, the population in the city centre fell dramatically. While Nygårdsparken had earlier been within short walking distance of 30,000 to 40,000 people, this was no longer the case. As a result, the interest in the park fell, leading to a lack of maintenance. Eventually, drug addicts, lacking better places to stay, began using the park for their purposes. Nygårdsparken evolved into the main drug area in Bergen, with sale of heroin, cannabis and other drugs taking place all day and night. The police have been criticised both for not paying attention to the amount of drug abuse taking place in the park, and for not taking action against drug dealers or the drug addicts themselves.

As part of a plan to increase the kindergarten capacity in Bergen, the municipality decided in 2007 to build seven temporary kindergartens in Bergen, including one in Nygårdsparken, with a total capacity of 550 children. Due to protests from locals, mostly concerning the unaesthetic appearance of the kindergarten and it being constructed too close to existing buildings, the construction has been halted several times, but the kindergarten is now in use.

References

Parks in Bergen
Urban decay in Norway